The Canada women's national rugby union team is governed by Rugby Canada, and plays in red and black. They were ranked 5th in World Rugby's inaugural women's rankings and are currently ranked as the third best team in the world. Canada competes in competitions such as the Pacific Four Series and the Rugby World Cup.

History

The Canadian women's program began to develop in the 1980s with the first match being played in 1987 in Victoria, British Columbia against another international rugby start-up, the United States. It was the first women's international test match that was played outside of Europe.

In 1991, Canada competed in the inaugural Women's Rugby World Cup in Wales. The team finished in fifth place after defeating Spain 19–4 in the Plate final. Canada has appeared in every World Cup since 1991.

Canada were finalists at the 2014 Rugby World Cup. They were drawn in the same pool with eventual winners, England. They had a 13 all draw during the pool stage before meeting in the final, Canada lost 21–9 and were runners-up.

In 2022, Canada finished fourth after losing to France in the third place final at the delayed 2021 Rugby World Cup.

Team Roster
Canada named their final 32-player squad on the 31 August 2022, for the 2021 Rugby World Cup. Maya Montiel, Cindy Nelles, Abby Duguid, Janna Slevinsky, Renee Gonzalez and Chloe Daniels were selected as non-travelling reserves.

Previous squads

Notable players 
Heather Moyse is the first Canadian woman to be inducted into the World Rugby Hall of Fame in 2016. She has represented Canada in rugby, cycling and bobsleigh; She won two gold medals at the Winter Olympics in 2010 and 2014. She has made 22 international appearances for Canada in 15s and has been to two Women’s Rugby World Cups in 2006 and 2010. She also helped Canada finish in second place at the 2013 Rugby World Cup Sevens in Russia.

Results

Overall

(Full internationals only; Last updated 16 November 2022)

World Cup

References

External links
 Rugby Canada's Home Page
 Canadian rugby union news from Planet Rugby

 
national
North American national women's rugby union teams
Women's national rugby union teams